The Daimler Car Hire Garage, a garage built for Daimler Hire Limited and later known as the Frames Coach Station, in Herbrand Street, in the Bloomsbury district of London, is a grade II listed building with Historic England.

History
The building was completed in 1931 for Daimler Hire Limited in the Art Deco and Streamline Moderne styles to a design by the architects Wallis, Gilbert and Partners.

Notes

References

External links 

Grade II listed commercial buildings
Grade II listed buildings in the London Borough of Camden
Art Deco architecture in London
Modernist architecture in London